Elisabeth Kohn (born February 11, 1902 in Munich, died November 25, 1941 near Kaunas) was a German-Jewish lawyer. In addition to her profession, she was involved in various social organizations, such as the SPD, the pacifist German League for Human Rights, the General German Trade Union Confederation and the SPD Munich Post. In November 1941, she was deported together with her mother and her sister Luise and murdered five days later in German-occupied Lithuania.

References

1902 births
1941 deaths
German Jews who died in the Holocaust
20th-century German lawyers
German women lawyers
German pacifists
German activists
German women activists
20th-century women lawyers
20th-century German women